'Happy Mistakes' is the debut and only studio album by American pop rock group Heffron Drive. It was released on September 9, 2014 under Schmidt's own label TOLBooth Records. Heffron Drive consists of members Kendall Schmidt and Dustin Belt.

Track listing

Charts

References

2014 debut albums
Heffron Drive albums
Self-released albums